Hobbs' Angel of Death was an Australian thrash metal band that began in 1987 in Melbourne, and are one of the first Australian groups to perform in that genre. They released two studio albums, Hobbs' Angel of Death (1988) and Inheritance (1995) before disbanding in 1996. They reformed in 2002 and released a compilation album, Hobbs' Satan's Crusade (2003), and a third album Heaven Bled (2016).

History
Hobbs' Angel of Death was formed in January 1987 in Melbourne, initially as a solo project for ex-Tyrus guitarist Peter Hobbs. With the help of ex-Nothing Sacred members, Karl Lean (bass guitar), Sham Littleman (drums) and Mark Woolley (guitar), the band recorded two demos, Angel of Death and Virgin Metal Invasion from Down Under, that attracted interest from overseas labels. They are one of the first Australian groups to perform European style thrash metal.

Although playing traditional style thrash metal, Hobbs described his band's sound as "virgin metal" – a pure form of metal music.

In February and March 1988, they were at Musiclab studios in Berlin to record their debut self-titled album, Hobbs' Angel of Death. Produced by Harris Johns, it was released in July on German label Steamhammer Records, and "became a best-seller in Europe". The line-up for the album was Hobbs and Woolley with Philip Gresik on bass guitar and Darren McMaster-Smith on drums. In 1989, Hobbs and Woolley with Bruno Canziani (drums) and Dave Frew (bass guitar) began touring. Frew and Canziani were two-thirds of the band Rampage, who disbanded in 1988 due to singer-guitarist George Mitrov having converted to Christianity and denouncing metal music as "demonic".

A second album, Inheritance was released in 1995, but failed to repeat the success of its predecessor and was an Australia-only release. It was difficult to obtain outside Australia and the band had "emerged from the darkness with a poorly produced second" album. Hobbs' Angel of Death broke up soon after its release.

In 2002, Hobbs reformed the band and released a compilation album of two early demos. The band played a European tour including an appearance at Wacken Festival, and shows with German thrash group Destruction and black metal act Mayhem. In July 2003, keyboardist Talie Helene, despite never having recorded nor played live with Hobbs' Angel of Death, left to form her own band, Stone Maiden. Remaining members were Hobbs, Canziani and Frew.

In 2011, Hobbs' Angel of Death returned to the live scene supporting Forbidden in Sydney on their Australian tour, and playing a small number of live shows before embarking on several European tours throughout 2012 and 2013. In August 2014, Peter Hobbs made an appearance in the Australian metal documentary Metal Down Under. Hobbs Angel of Death toured the US later in the year.

Hobbs' Angel of Death released their third album Heaven Bled in 2016, and continued to tour Europe. However, in 2018 further touring was cancelled due to Peter Hobbs' health issues. The band did not play again until 2019, performing at Heathen Fest in Southern New South Wales. This show would be Peter Hobbs' final live appearance.

On 21 October 2019, Peter Hobbs died at the age of 58. A tribute concert in Hobbs' memory was organised in Melbourne on 29 November. The concert consisted of a live performance of Hobbs' material from both Tyrus and Angel of Death by former bandmates and friends.

Members
Final lineup
Peter Hobbs (died 21 October 2019) – vocals, rhythm guitar
Simon Wizén – lead guitar
Alessio "Cane" Medici – bass
Brandon Gawith – drums

Past
Lead guitar – Damiano "Idda" Porciani, Luke Anticevic, Mark Wooley, Nick Maltezos, Jason Saunders, Brian Sinclair, Homa King, James Caldwell
Drums – Matt "Skitz" Sanders, Sham Littleman, Darren McMaster-Smith, Bruno "Anticros" Canziani, Jarro "Nuclear Exterminator" Raphael, Rob Molica, Jim Sinclair, Elliot Bell, Iago Bruchi
Bass – Bo Remy, Philip "Bullet Eater" Gresik, Karl Lean, Dave Frew, Jay Sanders

Discography

Albums
Hobbs' Angel of Death (Steamhammer Records SHLP 7006, SPV 85-7525, July 1988)
Track listing

Inheritance (Def Records, 1995)
Track listing

Extended plays
 Virgin Metal Invasion from Down Under (February 1987)
 Angel of Death (November 1987)

Compilations
 Demolition - Scream Your Brains Out! (Chain Reaction Records, 1988) - Metal Forces compilation with the songs "Chainsaw Massacre" and "Satan's Crusade"
 Hobbs' Satan's Crusade (Modern Invasion Music MIM7336-2CD, 2003)
Track listing

References

Australian heavy metal musical groups
Australian thrash metal musical groups
Musical groups established in 1985
Musical groups disestablished in 1996
Musical groups reestablished in 2002
Musical groups disestablished in 2019
Musical groups from Melbourne
Musical quartets
1985 establishments in Australia